Raymond Schultz may refer to:

 Raymond Schultz (bishop), bishop of the Evangelical Lutheran Church in Canada
 Raymond Schultz (figure skater) (born 1990), Canadian pair skater
 Ray Schultz (born 1976), Canadian ice hockey player